Oleg Lvovich Mitvol (born October 3, 1966)  is a Russian environmentalist, businessman and government official, known for his activity in the chair of environmental protection department.

Career

Media tycoon (1997-2003)
In 1997 - 2003 Mitvol was the chairman of the JSC newspaper Novye Izvestia.

As media tycoon Boris Berezovsky, owner of the newspaper, had fled from Russia to London, Mitvol obtained a 76% share in the newspaper from him, but Berezovsky effectively continued to support the newspaper financially. However, on February 20, 2003, Oleg Mitvol, citing a decision of a meeting of the board, kept secret from the journalists despite their 24% share, accused Director General of Novye Izvestiya Igor Golembiovsky of misappropriation of funds and fired him. The publication was suspended.

Berezovsky claimed that Mitvol's move was politically motivated, as the newspaper was opposed to President Vladimir Putin and on that very day had published an article by Vladimir Pribylovsky about the allegedly emerging cult of Putin's personality.

Environmental regulator (2004-2009)
In April 2004 he was made Deputy Head of the Russian Federal Service for the Oversight of Natural Resources. He soon became attracting media attention with environmental crimes investigations.

One of the famous campaigns by Mitvol was "Dacha war", against elite cottage settlements that were illegally built in the gallery forest area on Istra River shores. The "Piatnitsa" cottage settlement was ordered to be deconstructed. It was followed by protests of cottage owners.

Another of his activities was about Pacific Sakhalin island environment and its possible damage by oil-gathering companies. In September 2006, he threatened to revoke environmental authorisation for Royal Dutch Shell's Sakhalin II oil and gas production project. Mitvol was known by some in the UK press as "the Kremlin's attack dog" as a result.

On 14 December 2006, Sergei Sai, Head of the Service, tried - and failed - to fire Mitvol from this position. The next day, Mitvol brought in London lawyer Mark Stephens to take proceedings to preserve the Russian Far East.

On 18 January 2008 tendered his resignation of his position of deputy head of Rosprirodnadzor. This was rejected by minister of natural resources Yury Trutnev. After what can be termed several attempts by his superiors at his constructive dismissal, in April 2009 Mitvol resigned again.

Accusation of plagiarism 
According to examination performed by Dissernet, both doctoral (2002) and higher doctoral (2004) theses of Mitvol contain gross plagiarism from several doctoral and higher doctoral theses.

References and notes

See also
Sakhalin-II
Novye Izvestiya

External links

Official biography(in Russian). 

Russian environmentalists
Politicians from Moscow
Russian newspaper publishers (people)
1966 births
Living people
Netherlands–Russia relations